Don Juan Mateos is an oil on canvas painting widely attributed to Diego Velázquez created circa 1632–3.

Background
This work is widely attributed to Diego Velázquez and has been dated to 1632 or 1633. Sold as the work of Rubens in 1746 to Augustus III of Poland, it passed from his collection into the Gemäldegalerie Alte Meister in Dresden, where for some time it was considered the work of Titian.

The portrait, cut below the waist, wears black with golden highlights and a white collar. The hands, only outlined, rest the right on the hilt of a pistol the left on the sword. The figure is cut out on a reddish-gray background, brighter in front of the figure. The head, intensely illuminated and slightly turned, looks at the viewer with a penetrating gaze. Signs of ageing include the wrinkles on his nose and his neck.

The model is believed to be Juan Mateos, Philip IV's horseman and main crossbowman. Art historian Carl Justi compared the Velázquez portrait with the small portrait of the author and hunter engraved by Pedro Perete that appears on the front of his work, Origen y dignidad de la caza (Origin and Dignity of Hunting). Jonathan Brown suggests that the portrait could have been acquired on the death of Mateos by Ippolito Camillo Guidi, ambassador of the Duke of Modena in Madrid from 1641 to 1643, commissioned by the Duke, after a visit to the Madrid court, to purchase works of art to hedge against the constant devaluation of the billon currency used in his remuneration. The inventory of the goods left at his death by Mateos included, in fact, together with a small number of religious paintings, two portraits, one his and another of his wife, María Marquart, now deceased, but they were cited as full-length portraits and were jointly valued at just 100 reales, with no indication of the painter's name.

Bibliography

References

External links 

 Online Catalogue entry for Don Juan Mateos

Collections of the Gemäldegalerie Alte Meister
1631 paintings
17th-century portraits
Portraits of men
1630s in Spain
Portraits by Diego Velázquez